Pinecrest Academy is a private Catholic PreK3-12 school in Cumming, Georgia, United States.  It is located in the Archdiocese of Atlanta.

Background

The Pinecrest Academy was established in 1993 to serve the north Atlanta area. The high school was added in 2003, graduating its first students in May 2007.

In March 1998, Pinecrest received accreditation status from the Georgia Accrediting Commission, Inc. In August 1998, Pinecrest began its sixth year of growth on its own 53 acre campus in a six building, 15-classroom facility near the city of Cumming in south Forsyth County, where it currently resides. In the fall of 2003, the high school opened and the campus expanded by 68 acres.

In 2007, the school graduated the first high school class.  the facilities include a lower school campus for Pre-Kindergarten through 5th grades, a middle school building for grades 6-8, a high school building for grades 9-12, high school gymnasium with cafeteria, lower school gymnasium, lighted athletic fields, cross country course, and playgrounds. In 2007, Pinecrest received a donation to build and compete the Our Lady of Guadalupe Chapel. Other additions that year included an amphitheater, baseball field, and soccer/football fields. The baseball field was completed in the spring of 2007 and is considered the premier high school playing field in Forsyth County. A new lower school building opened in fall of 2019, and the school's athletic turf field debuted in 2019 as well.

In April 2012 the then three-year-old school band, composed of 6th-12th grade students, performed at Carnegie Hall in Midtown Manhattan in New York City.  The band took first place with straight superior ratings at the Worldstrides Music Festival in 2017.The school's Visual Arts program has been the recipient of numerous awards, including Scholastic Art and Writing Awards through 2021.

A 2014 National Blue Ribbon School, Pinecrest has also been a School of Excellence, as named by the Cardinal Newman Society, since 2007.

Other affiliations and accreditations include Georgia Independent Schools Association (GISA), Atlanta Area Association of Independent Schools (AAAIS), National Catholic Educational Association (NCEA) and Southern Association of Independent Schools (SAIS).

See also

 List of private schools in Atlanta
 National Catholic Educational Association

Notes and references

External links
 School website
 Map

Catholic secondary schools in Georgia (U.S. state)
Schools in Forsyth County, Georgia
Educational institutions established in 1993
Private middle schools in Georgia (U.S. state)
Private elementary schools in Georgia (U.S. state)
Regnum Christi
Legion of Christ
1993 establishments in Georgia (U.S. state)